Svein Richard Brandtzæg (born 23 December 1957, in Haugesund) is a Norwegian chemist and business executive.

Brandtzæg has a PhD in Chemistry from the Norwegian University of Science and Technology in Trondheim. He also has a graduate business degree from BI Norwegian Business School.
He has worked at Norsk Hydro since 1979, working on Søderberg aluminum cell technology in Karmøy. In 1985, he joined the state-owned aluminum company Årdal og Sunndal Verk (ÅSV) when it merged with Norsk Hydro, and since then has held a number of leadership positions in the aluminum division of Norsk Hydro. He was appointed CEO of Norsk Hydro on 12 January 2009 after Eivind Reiten chose to resign from the position. He took over management of the company on April 1.

On 1 January 2014, Brandtzæg was appointed chairman at NTNU, by Per-Kristian Foss, who vacated the position upon becoming Auditor General. Brandtzæg is a fellow of the Norwegian Academy of Technological Sciences.

In his capacity as CEO of Norsk Hydro, Brandtzæg is a member of the European Round Table of Industrialists, a lobbying group of Europe's largest industrial companies. Brandtzæg is a member of the Bilderberg Conference.

He is married and has three children.

References

Norwegian businesspeople
Norsk Hydro people
Members of the Norwegian Academy of Technological Sciences
1957 births
Living people